Pok Tau Ha is a village in the Sha Tau Kok area of North District of Hong Kong.

Features
The Pok Tau Ha Old Lime Kiln is listed as a "Site of Archaeological Interest".

See also
 Yim Tso Ha

References

External links
 Delineation of area of existing village Yim Tso Ha and Pok Tau Ha (Sha Tau Kok) for election of resident representative (2019 to 2022)

Villages in North District, Hong Kong
Sha Tau Kok